Ankhkherednefer (name formerly read as Ankhrenepnefer, or Ankhsherynefer) was an ancient Egyptian official known from a block statue found in the Tell el-Maskhuta (perhaps ancient Pithom). The statue, made of red granite is now in the British Museum (BM 1007).

Biography

Ankhkherednefer served under king Osorkon II whose name appears on the statue. On the statue he bears the titles: Great Inspector of the Palace; Good scribe of the Temple of Atum, Lord of Tura and Supreme Lieutenant of the Pharaoh.

References
Notes

Citations

Literature 
Edouard Naville: The Store-city of Pithom and the Route of the Exodus, London, 1885, S. 13-14 with English translations of the texts, Frontispice, Text on plate IV). online 
Karl Jansen-Winkeln: Ägyptische Biographien der 22. und 23. Dynasstie, Teil 1, Wiesbaden 1985, S. 269-71 
Karl Jansen-Winkeln: Inschriften der Spätzeit, Bd. II: Die 22.-24. Dynastie, Wiesbaden, 2007, S. 126-127

External links 

 Statue of Ankhkheerednefer
 British Museum: Statue of Ankhkheerednefer

People of the Twenty-second Dynasty of Egypt
9th-century BC people